Matsakis is a Greek surname Ματσάκης. Notable people with the surname include:

 Manny Matsakis (born 1962), American football player and coach
 Marios Matsakis (born 1954), Greek-Cypriot doctor, coroner, forensic pathologist, and politician

Greek-language surnames